Brandon Chafee is an American politician currently serving as a state representative in the Connecticut House of Representatives, representing the 33rd District since 2021. Prior to running for the seat, Chafee served as the treasurer of the Middletown Democratic Party. On November 3, 2020, Chafee won the election for the 33rd District seat after defeating Republican challenger Lynda Szynkowicz. In the House, Chafee serves as a member of the Transportation and Environment Committees as well as the Finance, Revenue and Bonding Committee.

References

External links

Living people
21st-century American politicians
Democratic Party members of the Connecticut House of Representatives
Central Connecticut State University alumni
University of Connecticut alumni
People from Middletown, Connecticut
Year of birth missing (living people)